Léon Louis Deffoux (10 August 1881, in Paris – 15 February 1945, in Paris) was a 20th-century French journalist.

Works 
 Un Communard, préface de Henri Céard, Paris : Chez Figuière, 1913 IA
 On Naturalism and the Académie Goncourt
 L'immortalité littéraire selon M. de Goncourt, suivie d'une petite chronologie du Testament et de l'académie Goncourt, P., Delesalle, 1918, in-16, 47 p.
 Du Testament à l'Académie Goncourt, suivi d'une petite chronologie du Testament de l'Académie et du prix Goncourt, P., Société anonyme d'éditions et de librairie, 1920, in-16, 79 p.
 In collaboration with Émile Zavie, Le Groupe de Médan, followed by two essais on Naturalisme, P., Payot, 1920, in-16, 311 p., fac-sim., lettres inédites, 6 reprod. d'autographes, notes et documents nouveaux. Une édition ultérieure, revue et augmentée de textes inédits, couronnée par l'Académie française, P., Crès, in-16, 328 p., s.d.
 Des origines de l'académie Goncourt. Ed. de Goncourt membre de l'Académie de Bellesme, suivi du texte intégral du Testament avec références and commentaries, P., Mercure de France, 1921, in-8°, 32 p. (extrait du Mercure de France du 15 July 1921).
 Les Goncourt, Zola et l'Impressionnisme, in la Revue Mondiale, 1928, t. 186.
 Chronique de l'académie Goncourt, P., Firmin-Didot, 1929, petit in-8° carré, 231 p., with ill.
 Le Naturalisme avec un florilège des principaux écrivains naturalistes, P., les œuvres représentatives, coll. « Le XIXe siècle » dirigée par René Lalou, 1929, in-1 6, 287 p.
 Éphémérides de l'affaire du Journal et de la correspondance des Goncourt, en encartage hors texte de l'édition des Lettres d'Émile Zola à MM. de Goncourt, préf. by Maurice Le Blond, Paris, Paul Catin, 1929, coll. «Le Document Autographe», n°1 (these ephemerides cover the period from 27 January 1928 to 15 February 1928).

 On J.-K. Huysmans
 In collaboration with Émile Zavie, J.-K. Huysmans converti littéraire, Paris, Éditions des Écrits Français, 1914, in-16,15 p., portrait.
 Preface to the Logis de Huysmans, by M.-C. Poinsot and G.-H. Langé, Paris, Maison française d'art et d'édition, 1919, in-16, 64 p., portrait, fig.
 J.-K. Huysmans et les Pères Salésiens, a little known work by J.-K. H., l'esquisse biographique sur Don Bosco, P., Mercure de France, 15 October 1920, in-8°, 15 p.
 De J.-K. Huysmans et sur J.-K. Huysmans, P., in L'Ami du Lettré, G. Crès, 1923.
 Le 20e anniversaire de la mort de J.-K. Huysmans, P., in L'Ami du Lettré, 1928, Grasset, 1927.
 J.-K. Huysmans sous divers aspects, Notes, forgotten texts, references, bibliography and iconography, Paris, Mercure de France; Brussels, éd. N.R.B., 1942, in-16, 163 p., figure, portr. and fac-sim. h. texte. (Collection «Les essais», lère série, n°5), reprise de l'E. 0. (1927) c/ G. Crès, in-8°, 148 p., ill. with 4 lithos by O. Redon, but without the l'iconography.
 Iconographie de J.-K. Huysmans, précédée de notes sur un projet de journal de Huysmans et sur l'Institution Hortus, Paris, le Divan, 1942, in-8°, 21 p., H.C.

Sources 
 Almanach des lettres françaises et étrangères, under the direction of Léon Treich, Éditions Georges Crès & Cie, Saturday 2 February 1924,

References

External links 
 Biographie

Writers from Paris
1881 births
1945 deaths
20th-century French journalists